Reuben Way is an Australian footballer who plays as a left back for Heidelberg United in NPL Victoria.

In 2018 Way join with the Wellington Phoenix in the A-League. Having made many appearances in the lower leagues of Australian football, Way finally made his senior professional debut at the age of 28 as a substitute for Wellington Phoenix in a match against Perth Glory at Westpac Stadium on 2 December 2018.

References

External links 
 

1990 births
Living people
Association football defenders
Wellington Phoenix FC players
A-League Men players
National Premier Leagues players
Australian soccer players